This is the list of notable stars in the constellation Canis Minor, sorted by decreasing brightness.

See also
Lists of stars by constellation

Notes

References
 Wagman, M., Lost Stars: Lost, Missing, and Troublesome Stars from the Catalogues of Johannes Bayer, Nichoilas-Louis de Lacaille, John Flamsteed, and Sundry Others, The McDonald & Woodward Publishing Company, Blaksburg, 2003, p. 460.
 Flamsteed, J., (ed.) "Stellarum Inerrantium Catalogus Britannicus", Historia Coelestis Britannca, vol.3, H. Meere, London, 1725, p. 32.

List
Canis Minor